"Why Can't This Be Love" is a song by the American rock band Van Halen for their seventh studio album, 5150 (1986). The song was released as the lead single from 5150 through Warner Bros. Records. It was the group's first single with lead vocalist Sammy Hagar, who replaced founding member David Lee Roth. It was released on both 7" and 12" single formats, the 12" single featuring an extended version of the song. 

It was a hit single for the band, rising to number three on the Billboard Hot 100 in the US and helping 5150 reach the number one slot on the albums chart, a first for the band. It was also a top 10 hit in the United Kingdom, Australia and Germany and a top 20 single in Canada, the Netherlands and Sweden.

Background
The song is driven by bouncy lead keyboard work from Eddie Van Halen performed on an Oberheim OB-8.
Chuck Klosterman of Vulture.com ranked it the worst Van Halen song, saying that the band's decision to release the song as the first single of the Sammy Hagar era was "the worst decision the band ever made," but said it was not his least favorite Van Halen song to listen to.

Reception
Cash Box called it "a powerful pop/rock kicker."  Billboard said "hard-rocking hooks alternate with trademark guitar workouts."

Live performances and in popular culture
During the 5150 and OU812 tours, Eddie Van Halen played the keyboard parts (using either a Kurzweil K250 or Yamaha KX88 connected by MIDI to an OB-8 backstage) while Hagar played the guitar parts and the solo. For the For Unlawful Carnal Knowledge and subsequent tours, Van Halen took over the guitar parts and the keyboards were played backstage. Starting during the 1995 Balance tour, Michael Anthony and Eddie Van Halen would sing the second verse of the song during live performances. They would continue to do this on both the 1998 and 2004 tours.

The song is often a source of humor since it contains the tautological lyrics Only time will tell if we stand the test of time. In 2008, The Daily Telegraph named this the eighth worst lyric of all time.

Personnel
Sammy Hagar – lead vocals
Eddie Van Halen – guitar, keyboards, backing vocals
Michael Anthony – bass, backing vocals
Alex Van Halen – drums, backing vocals

Charts

Year-end charts

References

1986 singles
Van Halen songs
Cashbox number-one singles
Songs written by Eddie Van Halen
Songs written by Alex Van Halen
Songs written by Michael Anthony (musician)
Songs written by Sammy Hagar
Warner Records singles
1986 songs
Song recordings produced by Mick Jones (Foreigner)